Ucuma is a town and municipality in Huambo Province, Angola. The municipality had a population of 55,054 in 2014.

References

Populated places in Huambo Province
Municipalities of Angola